Qaleh Sefid-e Sofla may refer to:
 Qaleh Sefid-e Sofla, Kermanshah